The 1936 United States presidential election in North Carolina took place on November 3, 1936, as part of the 1936 United States presidential election. North Carolina voters chose 13 representatives, or electors, to the Electoral College, who voted for president and vice president.

North Carolina was won by incumbent President Franklin D. Roosevelt (D–New York), running with Vice President John Nance Garner, with 73.40 percent of the popular vote, against Governor Alf Landon (R–Kansas), running with Frank Knox, with 26.60 percent of the popular vote.

Results

Results by county

Notes

References

North Carolina
1936
1936 North Carolina elections